Taarun Chandrra (born 27 April 1983) is an Indian actor based in Kannada Film Industry. He made his film debut in the multi-starrer Khushi (2003) and has since then acted in various films, notably being, Geleya (2007), Love Guru (2009) and Gaana Bajaana (2010).

Early life and career 
Taarun was born in Bangalore. He graduated his bachelor of commerce degree from MES College, Bangalore. He underwent three months acting course at Kishore Namit Kapoor Acting Institute, before he entered into films. He first appeared as one of the lead actors in 2003 released film, Khushi. After Geleya, Hani Hani's successful run, he was approached for Parichaya and by director Prashant for his movie Love Guru, which won a state award for best movie. He had also acted in a Telugu film Valliddari Vayasu Padahare which was released in 2006. His last film appearance came in the Kannada film Goa. In November 2021, he signed the paranormal thriller film, Trin Trin. Directed by Anand Mishra, he is to star alongside Diganth.

Filmography

References

External links 
 

Living people
1983 births
Male actors in Kannada cinema
Indian male film actors
Male actors from Bangalore
21st-century Indian male actors